Jay Clifford Chamberlain (December 29, 1925 in Los Angeles, California – August 1, 2001) was a racing driver from the United States.  He participated in 3 World Championship Formula One Grands Prix, debuting on July 21, 1962.  He scored no championship points. He also participated in numerous non-Championship Formula One races.

Chamberlain finished ninth overall at Le Mans in 1957, but first in class, driving a Lotus Eleven. Chamberlain of Burbank, California, was the United States distributor for Lotus cars.

Complete Formula One results
(key)

Complete Formula One Non-Championship results
(key) (Races in bold indicate pole position)
(Races in italics indicate fastest lap)

References

1925 births
2001 deaths
American Formula One drivers
24 Hours of Le Mans drivers
Racing drivers from Los Angeles
World Sportscar Championship drivers
Burials at Valhalla Memorial Park Cemetery